Yıldız Tilbe (born 16 July 1966) is a Turkish singer of Kurdish descent and one of the best-selling musical artists in Turkey, known especially for her eastern-infused ballads.

Life and career
Yıldız Tilbe was born in the Gültepe district of Konak, İzmir, and is of Kurdish origin. She is the youngest of her parents' six children. She was known by the nickname "Yadigar" within her family. Her mother Altun was from Tunceli, while her father Ali was from Ağrı. Her father Ali Tilbe was a seasonal worker. She attended the Mustafa Rahmi Balaban School, but left after the second grade, and started singing from an early age. At the age of 18, she married Güngör Karahan. From this marriage she has a daughter, named Sezen Burçin. After five years the couple divorced. She then started singing in various nightclubs in İzmir.

She began her career in 1990 in a nightclub owned by Cengiz Özşeker. While performing at the nightclub in 1991, she met Sezen Aksu, who asked Tilbe to become her backing vocalist. After accepting her offer, Tilbe moved to Istanbul and worked for Sezen Aksu for a while. After parting her way from Aksu, Tilbe started performing at Istanbul's nightclubs. She subsequently got an offer from Cem Özer to perform as a soloist in the program Laf Lafı Açıyor. With her appearance on this show, she became famous and released her first album, Delikanlım, in 1994, which became a hit in Turkey. In addition to her singing career, she started songwriting. In her songs, she addresses subjects such as sadness, love and separation and primarily uses romantic themes in her songs and compositions. In her romantic songs, she uses an imaginative and powerful language. Tilbe has composed many songs for several other artists and collaborated with them on their music projects. About her songs Tilbe said:

In 1996, the anti-narcotics police found some cannabis at her house. Tilbe was held in custody and was released after three days. To get rid of her addiction to cannabis, she was hospitalized at Balıklı Greek Hospital for a while. In the same year, she released her new album, Aşkperest. In the late 1990s, she worked at various nightclubs in Istanbul, Bursa and Eskişehir. In 2001, the release of her new album Gülüm brought her back to the stardom, which was followed by the album Haberi Olsun in 2002. In 2003, all of the songs on her album Yürü Anca Gidersin became hits in Turkey. Throughout her career, she has won many awards and received various nominations.

In 2004, Tilbe was diagnosed with uterine cancer and underwent surgery and treatment at Hacettepe University Medical School. Tilbe has related her illness to the personal issues she was dealing with at the time and said:

Once she received a marriage offer from Azer Bülbül but she did not accept his proposal.

Controversies
After the 2006 Israeli airstrike on Lebanon, during a television appearance Tilbe said "May God bring down one disaster after another upon Israel," to which the studio audience answered "Amen." In response to Israeli airstrikes on Gaza in early July 2014, Tilbe is reported to have said on social media site Twitter: "God bless Hitler, it was even too few what he did to the Jews, he was right" and "The Jews will be destroyed by Muslims, in the name of Allah, not much time left for it to be done". Her tweets received support from Melih Gökçek, the mayor of Ankara, who is a member of the ruling Justice and Development Party and himself a controversial figure. Later she tweeted that did not mean to praise Hitler and that she also has some Jewish friends and acquaintances.

Yıldız Tilbe, who was a guest on the İbo Show music program broadcast on the Turkish channel ATV in 2009, got angry and reacted when her song was interrupted by Turkish singer and the program's presenter İbrahim Tatlıses. Tatlıses found Tilbe's behavior disrespectful, reminding her that "I saved you from the pimps." This further caused tension between them and Tilbe left the program.

During an interview in 2012 she called a journalist bitch for which she later went on trial.

Discography

Studio albums

Live albums

EPs

Singles

As featured artist

Contributions 

* The list above includes songs given to other artists whose lyrics or music belong to Yıldız Tilbe. She has songs in her own albums that are written and composed by herself but are not mentioned in this list.

Filmography

References

External links

1966 births
Living people
Musicians from İzmir
Turkish women singers
Turkish pop musicians
Turkish people of Kurdish descent
Zaza people
Turkish folk-pop singers
Golden Butterfly Award winners